Thennamanadu South is a village in the Orathanadu taluk of Thanjavur district, Tamil Nadu, India.

Demographics 

As per the 2001 census, Thennamanadu South had a total population of 3611 with 1712 males and 1899 females. The sex ratio was 1109. The literacy rate was 66.43.

References 

 

Villages in Thanjavur district